Thomas Watson (born 29 September 1969) is an English former professional footballer who played as a midfielder between 1988 and 2010 notably played for Grimsby Town. Watson also played for Hull City and went on to form, manage and play for Lincolnshire Soccer School, which is now known as Cleethorpes Town.

Playing career
Liverpool-born Watson played for The Mariners as a youngster and was promoted to the club's first team squad in 1988. He could operate all over midfield but favoured to play on the right side of the flank. In 1995, he also spent time on loan with Hull City. He stayed with The Mariners up until 1996 when he retired due to injury.

Coaching career
After retiring Watson formed his own football club in North East Lincolnshire named Lincolnshire Soccer School in 1998 which focused on both the men's and women's game ranging from ages 7 all the way up to the senior game. Watson played and managed the senior team from 1998 until 2010. In 2009 the club name changed to Cleethorpes Town Football Club.

Honours

Grimsby Town
Young Player Of The Season: 1988
Football League Fourth Division runners up: 1989–90

References

External links

Tommy Watson profile at thefishy.co.uk

1969 births
Living people
Footballers from Liverpool
English footballers
Association football midfielders
Grimsby Town F.C. players
Hull City A.F.C. players
Cleethorpes Town F.C. players
English Football League players
English football managers
Cleethorpes Town F.C. managers